The Flens-Arena (until November 2012 the Campushalle) is an indoor sporting arena located in Flensburg, north Germany.  The capacity of the arena is 6,300 people.  It is currently home to the SG Flensburg-Handewitt handball team.

References

External links 

 

Sports venues in Schleswig-Holstein
Handball venues in Germany
Indoor arenas in Germany
Buildings and structures in Flensburg
Sport in Flensburg